The Norwegian Army Command Germany was in charge of the Norwegian contribution to the occupation of the British Zone in Germany, which with the creation of NATO also become a defence force. It was active from the fall of 1946 to the summer of 1953 and represented the Norwegian Army High Command with regards to both the Independent Norwegian Brigade Group in Germany and the British Army of the Rhine. With changing brigades every 6 months the command represented the continuity in the Norwegian presence in Germany.

Commanders

See also
 Independent Norwegian Brigade Group in Germany
 Allied-occupied Germany

Sources and Notes 
 Tysklandsbrigaden, a veterans' homepage.
 Agreement relating to the participation of a Norwegian brigade group in the occupation of the British Zone in Germany.

Allied occupation of Germany
Norwegian Army